Charles Earl Simons Jr. (August 17, 1916 – October 26, 1999) was a United States district judge of the United States District Court for the District of South Carolina.

Education and career

Born in Johnston, South Carolina, Simons received an Artium Baccalaureus degree from the University of South Carolina in 1937 and a Bachelor of Laws from the University of South Carolina School of Law in 1939. He was in private practice in Aiken, South Carolina from 1939 to 1964. He was a United States Naval Reserve Lieutenant during World War II, from 1942 to 1945. He was a member of the South Carolina House of Representatives in 1942 and from 1947 to 1948 and from 1960 to 1964.

Federal judicial service

On April 15, 1964, Simons was nominated by President Lyndon B. Johnson to a seat on the United States District Court for the Eastern District of South Carolina vacated by Judge Ashton Hilliard Williams. Johnson was confirmed by the United States Senate on April 30, 1964, and received his commission on May 1, 1964. On November 1, 1965, he was reassigned by operation of law to the United States District Court for the District of South Carolina, to a new seat established by 79 Stat. 951. He served as Chief Judge from 1980 to 1986, assuming senior status on August 17, 1986, and serving in that capacity until his death on October 26, 1999, in Aiken.

Honor

The Charles E. Simons Jr. Federal Court House was named for him in 1986.

References

Sources
 

1916 births
1999 deaths
Members of the South Carolina House of Representatives
Judges of the United States District Court for the Eastern District of South Carolina
Judges of the United States District Court for the District of South Carolina
United States district court judges appointed by Lyndon B. Johnson
20th-century American judges
United States Navy officers
20th-century American lawyers
People from Johnston, South Carolina
People from Aiken, South Carolina
20th-century American politicians